Christian Wilhelm Andresen (13 June 1811 – 28 October 1886) was a Norwegian judge.

He was born in Christiania to merchant Nicolai Andresen and Engel Johanne Christiane Reichborn. He graduated as cand.jur. in 1832, and was named as a Supreme Court Justice from 1859 to 1883 (acting from 1855). He was decorated as Knight of the Order of St. Olav in 1860, and as Commander in 1873.

References

1811 births
1886 deaths
Judges from Oslo
Supreme Court of Norway justices